Gordon Cecil Killick (3 June 1899 – 10 October 1962), also known as Bill Killick, was a British rower who competed in the 1924 Summer Olympics and in the 1928 Summer Olympics.

Life
Killick was born in Fulham. He was a member of Thames Rowing Club.

In 1924 he participated with his partner (and brother-in-law) Thomas Southgate in the first round of the coxless pairs event rowing at the 1924 Summer Olympics. But they did not start in the final, Southgate having suffered a bout of lumbago, and although considered to be in third place, were not awarded with medals. They were also spare pair for the British eight.

In 1925 Killick was a member of the crew that won the Wyfold Challenge Cup at Henley Royal Regatta, and in 1927 was a member of the crew that won the Grand Challenge Cup at Henley as well as the Wyfolds.  In 1928 he won the Silver Goblets & Nickalls' Challenge Cup at Henley partnering Jack Beresford. He was also a member of the Thames eight which won the Grand Challenge Cup  and which then won the silver medal for Great Britain rowing at the 1928 Summer Olympics. In 1929 he won Silver Goblets again with Jack Beresford.

Achievements

Olympic Games
 1928 – Silver, Eight

Henley Royal Regatta
 1925 – Wyfold Challenge Cup
 1927 – Grand Challenge Cup
 1927 – Wyfold Challenge Cup
 1928 – Grand Challenge Cup
 1928 – Silver Goblets & Nickalls' Challenge Cup (with Jack Beresford)
 1929 – Silver Goblets & Nickalls' Challenge Cup (with Jack Beresford)

References

External links
 profile

1899 births
1962 deaths
English male rowers
British male rowers
Olympic rowers of Great Britain
Rowers at the 1924 Summer Olympics
Rowers at the 1928 Summer Olympics
Olympic silver medallists for Great Britain
Olympic medalists in rowing
Medalists at the 1928 Summer Olympics